The Pioneer Range, is a small subdivision range of the Hart Ranges, of the Northern Rockies in British Columbia, Canada.  The boundaries of the Pioneer Range are generally the Murray River to the east, Monkman Glacier to the west, Imperial Creek to the north and the Limestone Lakes to the south.  The majority of the Pioneer Range lies within Monkman Provincial Park.

The Range is collectively named after individuals who participated in the pre-World War II efforts to construct a road through the area from Beaverlodge, Alberta to the Fraser River.

Official Peaks

References 

Mountain ranges of British Columbia
Northern Interior of British Columbia